National Secondary Route 102, or just Route 102 (or ) is a National Road Route of Costa Rica, located in the San José province.

Description
In San José province the route covers Vázquez de Coronado canton (San Isidro, Patalillo districts), Tibás canton (San Juan, Anselmo Llorente districts), Moravia canton (San Vicente district).

References

Highways in Costa Rica